The 2002–03 Premier League of Bosnia and Herzegovina was the third season since its establishment and distinguishes itself from previous seasons by having expanded the country-wide league to include the clubs from Republika Srpska in the competition. This season began on 3 August 2002 and ended on 24 May 2003. 

The league was won by FK Leotar after a dramatic last round where they defeated away team Rudar Ugljevik (2–1). Široki Brijeg defended successfully against the defending home champions Željezničar (1–0).

Clubs and stadiums

League standings

Results

Champions
FK Leotar Trebinje (Coach: - Mile Jovin)Squad:
Dušan Berak - Gk
Goran Berak - Gk
Aleksandar Božović - Gk
Uroš Golubović - Gk
Gavrilo Čorlija - Df
Ninoslav Milenković - Df
Igor Miljanović - Df
Saša Miljanović - Df
Dejan Musović - Df
Zdravko Šaraba - Df
Bojan Vučinić - Df
Predrag Vukičević - Df
Savo Andrić - Mf
Slavoljub Đorđević - Mf
Aleksandar Hajder - Mf
Pajo Janković - Mf
Dušan Kerkez - Mf
Branislav Krunić - Mf
Jovo Mišeljić - Mf
Siniša Mulina - Mf
Pavle Delibašić - Fw
Milan Joksimović - Fw
Željko Kokić - Fw
Ljubiša Porobić - Fw
Željko Radović - Fw
Damjan Ratković - Fw
Nenad Stojanović - Fw

References
Bosnia-Herzegovina - List of final tables (RSSSF)

Premier League of Bosnia and Herzegovina seasons
1
Bosnia